The Seventh Government of the Republic of Croatia was the first of two Croatian Government cabinets led by Prime Minister Ivica Račan. It was appointed on 27 January 2000 by a decree of the Acting President of the Republic and Speaker of Parliament, Vlatko Pavletić. The cabinet was confirmed by a parliamentary vote of confidence in the Chamber of Representatives on 2 February 2000, with 122 of 151 Members of Parliament voting for, 1 against and 1 abstaining. Its term ended on 30 July 2002, when it was reconstructed and replaced by Cabinet of Ivica Račan II. The cabinet was formed following the 2000 parliamentary elections, in which the centre-right party Croatian Democratic Union (HDZ) was defeated by a broad coalition of several centre-left parties. This marked an end to  HDZ's dominance in Croatian politics since the first multi-party election in 1990. However, the period under Prime Minister Račan was marred with constant disagreements among coalition members, which later led to some parties leaving the ruling coalition. This ultimately paved the way for HDZ's return to power in the 2003 parliamentary elections.

Parties included in the original coalition and their quotas:
Social Democratic Party (SDP) – 11 seats in cabinet (PM, 2 Deputy PM's and 8 ministers)
Croatian Social Liberal Party (HSLS) – 5 seats in cabinet (1 Deputy PM and 4 ministers)
Croatian People's Party (HNS) – 1 seat in cabinet (1 minister)
Croatian Peasant Party (HSS) – 3 seats in cabinet (3 ministers)
Istrian Democratic Assembly (IDS) – 1 seat in cabinet (1 minister)
Liberal Party (LS) – 1 seat in the cabinet (1 minister)

This was the last cabinet to hold office under a relatively powerful semi-presidential system (at times more resembling a superpresidential system), as constitutional changes implemented by the new center-left government shifted considerable political power and authority away from the President of the Republic towards the prime minister and his government cabinet as a whole. However, the new parliamentary system retains the direct election of the President by universal suffrage (rather than a president who would be elected by parliament) and can therefore be considered to be an incomplete one.

Motions of confidence

Party breakdown 
Party breakdown of cabinet ministers:

Ministers

Changes

References

External links
Official website of the Croatian Government
Chronology of Croatian cabinets at Hidra.hr 

Racan, 1
2000 establishments in Croatia
2002 disestablishments in Croatia
Cabinets established in 2000
Cabinets disestablished in 2002